Ernest Bustmante is a former member of the Arizona House of Representatives from January 2003 until January 2005, representing the newly redistricted District 23. He ran for re-election in 2004 along with Cheryl Chase, but was defeated in the Democrat primary by Pete Rios. In 2008 he ran again for the House in District 23, and won the Democrat primary along with Barbara McGuire.  However, while McGuire won, Bustamante lost in the general election to Frank Pratt. He again ran in 2010, and won the Democrat primary, along with McGuire, but in the general election they both lost to Pratt and John Fillmore. He ran once again in 2012, this time in District 8, after redistricting. He and Emily Verdugo won the Democrat primary, but they both lost in the general election, to Pratt and T. J. Shope.

References

Democratic Party members of the Arizona House of Representatives
Year of birth missing (living people)
Living people